Love Won the Fight was the second album by pop rock band B.E. Taylor Group. It was released on New Year's Day, 1983.

The album spawned the charting single, "Vitamin L".

Released in 1983 as MCA-39007

Track listing
Love Won the Fight - 4:47 (Joe Macre / Rick Witkowski)     	  
Just a Beat Away - 4:33  (B.E. Taylor)
Break Down the Night - 4:39 (Joe Macre / Rick Witkowski) 
Lonely at the Bottom - 4:23 (Joe Macre) 
Vitamin L - 5:29 (Rick Witkowski / D. Witkowski) 
That Kind of Love Don't Last - 3:56 (Joe Macre / B.E. Taylor / Rick Witkowski) 
Should Have Called It Love - 4:05 (Rick Witkowski) 
Hold on to Love - 3:42 (Joe Macre) 
Break the Ice - 4:25 (Joe Macre)

Produced by Joe Macre and Rick Witkowski for BMO.
Executive Producer - Carl Maruri

References

1983 albums